The Three Musketeers is a 1953 French-Italian historical adventure film based on the 1844 French The Three Musketeers. This adaptation is one of five films director André Hunebelle and screen writer Michel Audiard achieved together. Georges Marchal portrayed d'Artagnan.

Plot
Young d'Artagnan leaves his parents and travels from his native Gascony to the capital of France because he wants to prove himself an excellent fencer and to become a musketeer. He is told by his father he must not avoid any duel. On his way to Paris, d'Artagnan feels that his honour is besmirched because he overhears how his horse is derided by a sinister nobleman. He can't help but demand immediate satisfaction. Unfortunately, of all men he finds he has challenged the Count de Rochefort, a shifty character to whom Cardinal Richelieu frequently entrusts covert operations. Rochefort's henchmen take care of d'Artagnan and steal from him. The enraged d'Artagnan is determined to take revenge and will eventually have the chance to do so, for the Queen has given a present to her secret admirer the Duke of Buckingham, and d'Artagnan must retrieve it from him, although he is now already back in England.  If he fails her, Cardinal Richelieu is going to disclose Queen Anne's infidelity to King Louis XIII, in order to force a war against England upon him. The Cardinal and Count de Rochefort will do everything in their power if only they can put paid to d'Artagnan's mission. But with help from his three new friends d'Artagnan prevails.

Cast

Production
The film was shot in the Saint-Maurice Studios in Paris, on the premises of castle Fontainebleau and in the Forest of Fontainebleau. In 1966 André Hunebelle returned to Fontainebleau for his film Fantômas contre Scotland Yard.

Reception
It was the sixth most successful film at the French box office in 1953, after The Greatest Show on Earth, The Return of Don Camillo, Peter Pan, The Wages of Fear and Quo Vadis.

Due to the film's success André Hunebelle directed three more swashbuckler films (Le Bossu, Captain Blood and Le Miracle des loups) and hereby established Jean Marais as a fixture for this genre.

References

External links
 
 
 Biography of Michel Audiard on his homepage

1953 films
1950s French-language films
Films based on The Three Musketeers
Films shot in France
Films with screenplays by Michel Audiard
French swashbuckler films
Films set in the 1620s
Films set in France
Films set in Paris
Cultural depictions of Cardinal Richelieu
Cultural depictions of Louis XIII
1950s historical adventure films
French historical adventure films
Italian historical adventure films
Films directed by André Hunebelle
1950s Italian films
1950s French films